Hebrew University High School, commonly known as Leyada (literally "next to"), is a semi-private high school in West Jerusalem, established in 1935 by the Hebrew University of Jerusalem. The school is located next to the Givat Ram campus of the Hebrew University. It is considered one of the country's most prestigious and selective institutions of secondary education.

History
Founded in 1935 as Beit-Hakerem High School, it soon established a unique methodology and syllabus, carefully screening applicants through psychometric entrance exams. Over the years, the school has carried out several integration projects initially founded by Professor Karl Frankenstein (Hebrew: קרל פרנקנשטיין; born 16 February 1905, died 1990), a ground-breaking Israeli professor in special education and pedagogy. Over the years, these projects have changed names and structure and have attempted to diminish the school's social elitist stereotype. While many students come from middle- and upper-class families, there is a broad diversity of students at the school originating from a range of backgrounds, including Jewish, Arab, students from migrant families and more.

Academics
Leyada is considered one of the country's most prestigious and best achieving high schools. The school is in the process of reform and restructuring.  Dr. Gilead Amir has completed his role as Principal of the six-year programme in mid-2020, with Erez Hacker becoming Principal in mid 2020, Dr. Rivka Berger was Pedagogical Director and Vice Principal.  Rena Gampel was coordinator of the high school.

The school has a five-day week schedule (Sunday through Thursday), keeping facilities open on Fridays for special classes, self-study and projects. In addition to the 40+ classrooms upgraded with projectors, wi-fi and whiteboards, facilities include two 200 seat lecture halls, fully equipped physics and chemistry laboratories, a library, state-of-the-art art center, a chamber-music auditorium, a 600-seat theater, a modern professional sports center and a regulation-size basketball court.

The recent principal was Dr. Gilead Amir (class of 1970), who joined faculty in 1977 as a math teacher, and took the top position in 2003 from 35-year veteran Hana Levitte. Among the school's board of directors is Israeli Labor Party member Orna Angel, a 1980 Leyada graduate and former CEO of the Tel Aviv Port Authority.

Notable alumni

 Yitzhak Navon (class of 1939) – fifth President of Israel 
 Yohai Ben-Nun (1942) – sixth commander of the Israeli Sea Corps
 Daniel Kahneman (1951) – awarded the 2002 Nobel Prize in Economics
 Aharon Barak (1954) – Professor of law at the Hebrew University of Jerusalem, lecturer in law at the Yale Law School, President of the Supreme Court of Israel from 1995 to 2006
 Yehoram Gaon (1956) – singer and actor
Ruth Kark (1958) - Professor of Geography, Jerusalem Honor (Yakirat Yersushalyim), Herzl Prize.

 David Gross (1959) – awarded the 2004 Nobel Prize in Physics
 Tom Segev (1963) – journalist and historian
 Meir Shalev (1966) – writer
 David Grossman (1972) – author of fiction, nonfiction, and youth and children's literature
 Ido Nehoshtan (1975) – sixteenth commander of the Israeli Air Force
 Orit Strook (1979) – member of the Knesset for The Jewish Home party and a settler leader
 Etgar Keret (1985) – writer. The title of one of his books, Kneler's Summer Camp, is a reference to the school principal at his time, Dr. Shmuel Kneler.
 Gil Shwed (1986) – founder of Checkpoint
 Elon Lindenstrauss (1988) – awarded the 2010 Fields medal in Mathematics
 Anat Kamm (2004) – A journalist who has been convicted of providing confidential information without authorization, as part of the Anat Kamm-Uri Blau affair. Blau is another graduate of the school.
 Ofer Berkowitz (1983) - Deputy Mayor of Jerusalem and head of the Jerusalem Hitorerut political party.
 Eden Alene (2018) - Israel representative to Eurovision Song Contest 2021

The previous prime minister of Israel, Benjamin Netanyahu, has studied in the school, but did not graduate from it, because of his family's relocation to the United States.

Notable faculty
Yeshayahu Leibowitz (1903–94), an Israeli public intellectual, professor to Biochemistry, Organic chemistry and Neurophysiology at the Hebrew University of Jerusalem and a polymath known for his outspoken opinions on Judaism, ethics, religion and politics.
Batya Gur (1947-2005) Israeli writer.

References

External links
Hebrew University Secondary School website
Haaretz article, "Peretz stars in high school civics lesson"

Schools in Jerusalem
Educational institutions established in 1935
High schools in Israel
1935 establishments in Mandatory Palestine